Moose Brook State Park is a New Hampshire state park in Coos County, New Hampshire in the United States. The park, which was built by the Civilian Conservation Corps during the Great Depression, was opened to the public in 1936.

History
Moose Brook State Park was constructed during the Great Depression by workers from the Civilian Conservation Corps. The Civilian Conservation Corps (CCC) was a work relief program for young men from unemployed families, established in 1933. As part of President Franklin D. Roosevelt's New Deal legislation, it was designed to combat unemployment during the Great Depression. The CCC operated in every U.S. state. Young men from all over the country were assigned to the many CCC camps that were constructed in rural areas throughout the United States.

Moose Brook State Park is considered to be an excellent example of CCC design. The corps built park facilities and trails using the natural resources that were at hand. Cabins and other facilities were built with rocks and logs that were taken from the land surrounding their construction sites. The original park offices, built by the CCC, are still in use today. Other park facilities that were built by the CCC and are still in use include the bathhouse, campground and swimming area.

Geology
Moose Brook State Park is within the White Mountains. The White Mountains are part of the larger Appalachian Mountains. The magma intrusions forming the White Mountains today were created 124 to 100 million years ago as the North American Plate moved westward over the New England hotspot.

The park is named for Moose Brook. The brook is a tributary of the Androscoggin River, which flows south and east into Maine, joining the Kennebec River near the Atlantic Ocean. Moose Brook rises in the town of Randolph, New Hampshire, in Ice Gulch, a notch in the Crescent Mountain Range north of the White Mountains. Moose Brook exits the gulch by dropping over Peboamauk Fall, then continues east through the park to reach the Androscoggin River in the town of Gorham.

Recreation
Moose Brook State Park is open May through October. Recreation activities include camping, picnicking, mountain biking, swimming, hiking and fishing. There are 59 campsites at the park in a variety of areas. Some are wooded and shaded and others are in open, sunny areas. The campground opens on Memorial Day weekend and closes Columbus Day weekend. Moose Brook State Park is used as a base for visitors to the White Mountains and the Presidential Range.

References

External links
Moose Brook State Park New Hampshire Department of Natural and Cultural Resources

Civilian Conservation Corps in New Hampshire
Protected areas established in 1936
State parks of New Hampshire
Parks in Coös County, New Hampshire
Gorham, New Hampshire
1936 establishments in New Hampshire